The following roads are numbered 112:

Brazil 
 PA-112

Canada 
  New Brunswick Route 112
  Ontario Highway 112
  Prince Edward Island Route 112
  Quebec Route 112

China 
  China National Highway 112

Costa Rica
 National Route 112

India
 National Highway 112 (India)

Japan
 Route 112 (Japan)

Philippines
 N112 highway (Philippines)

United States 
  U.S. Route 112 (former)
  U.S. Route 112 (Wisconsin) (former proposal)
  Alabama State Route 112 (former)
  Arkansas Highway 112
  California State Route 112
  Colorado State Highway 112
  Connecticut Route 112
  Florida State Road 112
  Georgia State Route 112
  Indiana State Road 112
  K-112 (Kansas highway)
  Kentucky Route 112
  Louisiana Highway 112
  Maine State Route 112
  Maryland Route 112
  Massachusetts Route 112
  M-112 (Michigan highway)
  Minnesota State Highway 112
  Missouri Route 112
  Nebraska Highway 112
  New Hampshire Route 112
  County Route 112 (Bergen County, New Jersey)
  New Mexico State Road 112
  New York State Route 112
  County Route 112 (Fulton County, New York)
  County Route 112 (Niagara County, New York)
  County Route 112 (Rockland County, New York)
  County Route 112 (Suffolk County, New York)
  County Route 112 (Sullivan County, New York)
  County Route 112 (Wayne County, New York)
  County Route 112 (Westchester County, New York)
  North Carolina Highway 112
  Ohio State Route 112 (former)
  Oklahoma State Highway 112
  Pennsylvania Route 112 (former)
  Rhode Island Route 112
  Tennessee State Route 112
  Texas State Highway 112
  Farm to Market Road 112
  Utah State Route 112
  Vermont Route 112 
  Virginia State Route 112
  Virginia State Route 112 (1923-1928) (former)
  Virginia State Route 112 (1928-1933) (former)
  Virginia State Route 112 (1933-1943) (former)
  Washington State Route 112
  West Virginia Route 112
  Wisconsin Highway 112
  Wyoming Highway 112

Territories
  Puerto Rico Highway 112

See also
 List of highways numbered 112S
 A112 road
 D112 road
 P112
 R112 road (Ireland)
 S112 (Amsterdam)